The 9th IAAF World Cup in Athletics was an international track and field sporting event sponsored by the International Association of Athletics Federations. It was hosted by Madrid, September 21–22, 2002, in the Estadio La Peineta. The IAAF world cup event is currently held every four years.

The team winner of the men's competition was Africa, while the Russian team took the women's cup.

Overall results

Men

1 Great Britain originally finished eighth, but were disqualified in August 2003 after Dwain Chambers admitted to using THG between the beginning of 2002 and August 2003. All other individual results were allowed to stand, but the IAAF ruled these athletes received no score.

Women

Medal summary

Men

1 The United States originally finished second in 2:59.21, but were disqualified in 2009 after Antonio Pettigrew admitted to using HGH and EPO between 1997 and 2003.

Women

1 Marion Jones originally won this event in 10.90, but she was disqualified in 2007 after she admitted to drug use between 2000 and 2002. 
2 The United States originally finished second in 42.05, but were disqualified in 2007 after Marion Jones admitted to drug use between 2000 and 2002. 
3 The United States originally finished second in 3:24.67, but were disqualified in 2004 after Michelle Collins admitted to drug use between 2000 and 2002.

Results

References
 Official site

IAAF Continental Cup
World Cup
Ath
World Cup
Sports competitions in Madrid
2002 in Madrid